Jackie Jones Mountain is a  mountain in the state of New York. It is located west of Stony Point in Rockland County. In 1928, a  steel fire lookout tower was built on the mountain. The tower ceased fire lookout operations at the end of the 1988 fire lookout season, and was officially closed in early 1989. The tower is listed on the National Historic Lookout Register, and is open to the public.

History
In 1928, the Palisades State Park Commission built a  steel fire lookout tower on the mountain, to replace the wood tower previously built on the mountain. In 1931, the Conservation Department took over operation of the fire tower. The tower ceased fire lookout operations at the end of the 1988 fire lookout season. It was officially closed by the New York State Department of Environmental Conservation in early 1989. In 2019, the tower was restored by the Forest Fire Lookout Association, Team Rubicon, and the Park. The tower is listed on the National Historic Lookout Register, and is open to the public.

References

Mountains of Rockland County, New York
Mountains of New York (state)